The Southern Cone is a geographical and cultural subregion composed of the southernmost areas of South America, mostly south of the Tropic of Capricorn. Traditionally, it covers Argentina, Chile, and Uruguay, bounded on the west by the Pacific Ocean and on the east by the Atlantic Ocean. In terms of social, economic and political geography, the Southern Cone comprises Argentina, Chile, and Uruguay, and sometimes includes Brazil's four southernmost states (Paraná, Rio Grande do Sul, Santa Catarina, and São Paulo). In its broadest definition, taking into account common history and geography, it also includes Paraguay, another Spanish-speaking country.

High life expectancy, the highest Human Development Index of Latin America, high standard of living, low fertility rates, significant participation in global markets and the emerging economy of its members make the Southern Cone the most prosperous subregion in Latin America.

Geography and extent

The climates are mostly temperate, but include humid subtropical, Mediterranean, highland tropical, maritime temperate, sub-Antarctic temperate, highland cold, desert and semi-arid temperate regions. Except for northern regions of Argentina (thermal equator in January), the whole country of Paraguay, the Argentina-Brazil border and the interior of the Atacama Desert, the region rarely suffers from heat. In addition to that, the winter presents mostly cool temperatures. Strong and constant wind and high humidity is what brings low temperatures in the winter. The Atacama is the driest place on Earth.

One of the most peculiar plants of the region is the Araucaria tree, which can be found in Brazil, Chile and Argentina. The only native group of conifers found in the southern hemisphere had its origin in the Southern Cone. Araucaria angustifolia, once widespread in Southern Brazil, is now a critically endangered species, protected by law. The prairies region of central Argentina, Uruguay and southern Brazil is known as the Pampas.

Central Chile has Mediterranean vegetation and a Mediterranean climate, grading southward into an oceanic climate. The Atacama, Patagonian and Monte deserts form a diagonal of arid lands separating the woodlands, croplands and pastures of La Plata basin from Central and Southern Chile. Apart from the desert diagonal, the north–south running Andes form a major divide in the Southern Cone and constitute, for most of its part in the southern cone, the Argentina–Chile border. In the east the river systems of the La Plata basin form natural barriers and sea-lanes between Argentina, Brazil, Paraguay and Uruguay.

Image gallery

Brazil 

Southern Brazil has a temperate climate with annual average temperatures varying between 12 °C (53.6 °F) and 22 °C (71.6 °F). During the months of June, July and August, high altitude areas in the South Region can receive snowfall. The state of São Paulo has seven distinct climatic types. The mountainous areas of the state have a subtropical climate (Cfa). In areas of high altitude, the average temperature is below 18 °C (64 °F). Oceanic (Cfb and Cwb) on the coast, the climate is of a super-humid tropical type (Af), without a dry season. The tropical climate of altitude (Cwa), predominant in the state territory, specifically in the center, is characterized by a temperature above 22 °C (72 °F) in the hottest month of the year. The occurrence of snow is rare, but has been recorded in Campos do Jordão and there are also reports that the phenomenon has occurred in several parts in the south.

Culture

Besides sharing languages and colonial heritage, the residents of the states of the Southern Cone are avid players and fans of football, with top-notch teams competing in the sport. Argentina and Uruguay have both won the FIFA World Cup twice; they are the only national teams along with Brazil outside Europe to have won the cup. Argentina, Chile, Uruguay, and Brazil have all hosted the World Cup. Additionally, national teams from the region have won several Olympic medals in football. Also, football clubs from the Southern Cone countries have won large numbers of club competitions in South-American competitions, Pan-American competitions, and world-FIFA Club World Cup-level competitions.

The asado barbecue is a culinary tradition typical of the Southern Cone. The asado developed from the horsemen and cattle culture of the region, more specifically from the gauchos of Argentina, Uruguay and Southern Brazil (and Southern Chile) and the huasos of Central Chile. In the Southern Cone, horsemen are considered icons of national identity; they are featured in the epic poem Martín Fierro. Mate is popular throughout the Southern Cone.

In this area, there was extensive European immigration during the 19th- and 20th-centuries, who, with their descendants, have strongly influenced the culture, social life and politics of these countries. Immigration reshaped the modern-day societies of both Argentina and Uruguay, countries where the influx of newcomers was massive.

In a social survey, residents rated their countries as 'good places for gay or lesbian people to live;' the following percentages said 'yes' in Uruguay (71%), Argentina (68%), Brazil (68%), and Chile (52%). By contrast, fewer people in the following countries agreed: Bolivia (31%) and Peru (35%).

Language
The overwhelming majority, including those of recent immigrant background, speak Spanish (in Argentina, Chile, Paraguay, and Uruguay) or Portuguese in the case of Southern Brazil.  The Spanish-speaking countries of the Southern Cone are divided into two main dialects:

Castellano Rioplatense (River Plate Spanish), spoken in Argentina and Uruguay, where the accent and daily language is heavily influenced by 19th-20th century Italian immigrants, has a particular intonation famously recognized by Spanish speakers from around the world. It is sometimes erroneously referred to as "Castellano Argentino/Argentinean Spanish" due to the majority of the speakers (by population) being Argentinians. Preliminary research has shown that Rioplatense Spanish has intonation patterns that resemble those of Italian dialects in the Naples region, differing markedly from those of other forms of Spanish. Buenos Aires, Rosario, and Montevideo had a massive influx of Italian immigrant settlers from the mid-19th until mid-20th centuries. Researchers note that the development of this dialect is a relatively recent phenomenon, developing at the beginning of the 20th century with the main wave of Italian immigration.
Castellano Chileno (Chilean Spanish)

These dialects share common traits, such as a number of Lunfardo and Quechua words.

Minor languages and dialects include Cordobés, Cuyo, and Portuñol, a hybrid between Rioplatense and Brazilian Portuguese that is spoken in Uruguay on the border with Brazil.

Native American languages
Some Native American groups, especially in rural areas, continue to speak autochthonous languages, including Mapudungun (also known as Mapuche), Quechua, Aymara, and Guarani. The first is primarily spoken in Araucanía and adjacent areas of Patagonia, in southern Argentina and Chile. Guarani is an official language of Paraguay, the most widely spoken language in that country, and in 2010, the city of Tacuru, in the Brazilian state of Mato Grosso do Sul, adopted Guarani as the official language, besides Portuguese. It is also a co-official language in the northeastern Argentine provinces of Corrientes and Misiones.

Non-Iberian immigrant languages
English is spoken in the Falkland Islands, a British Overseas Territory (disputed by Argentina), and by descendants of British settlers in Argentina and Chile. Welsh is spoken by descendants of immigrants in the Patagonia region of Argentina.

Italian (mostly its Northern dialects, such as Venetian), is spoken in rural communities across Argentina, Southern Brazil, and São Paulo where immigrants had settled.
German, in various dialects, is mostly spoken in Southern Chile and Southern Brazil. It is the second most spoken mother tongue in Brazil.
Polish, Dutch and Ukrainian are also spoken in Southern Brazil. Dutch is spoken in Chile as well, Ukrainian is used in Argentina as well. Croatian and other Slavic languages are also spoken in the southernmost areas of Chilean Patagonia, reflecting patterns of immigration and settlement.

Yiddish can be heard mainly in Buenos Aires, Argentina and São Paulo, Brazil.

In Brazil, Japanese is spoken by immigrant communities in the states of São Paulo and Paraná.

Selected words in the dialects of Southern Cone countries
Below there are selected words to show the similarities in vocabulary in the dialects of the countries of the Southern Cone.

Below there are selected words to show vocabulary in the dialects of the countries of the Southern Cone and other Spanish-speaking countries in South America and the dialect of Portuguese spoken in Brazil.

Religion

Like the rest of Latin America, most residents of the Southern Cone are members of the Catholic Church, with a minority of Protestants, including a significant Lutheran population in south Brazil. Other religions also present in the southern cone include Islam, Anglicanism, Eastern Orthodoxy, Buddhism, the Church of Jesus Christ of Latter-day Saints and Daoism. Jewish communities have thrived in cities of Argentina and Uruguay.

While the Southern Cone has been conservative in some aspects of religion, it has had a tradition of social reform and liberation theology has been followed by many in the Catholic Church. Uruguay, where agnosticism and atheism is common, has a policy of strong separation of church and state; it is one of the most secular countries in the Americas. Uruguay, Chile and Argentina, in that order, have the least religious residents in South America, according to their responses about the significance of religion in their lives. According to the Pew Research Center, 28% of Uruguayans, 43% of Argentines, and 41% of Chileans think of religion 'very important in their lives,' contrasting with the higher values given by the residents of countries such as Peru (72%), Colombia (77%) and Ecuador (76%).

The Southern Cone produced the first pope from the Western Hemisphere, Pope Francis, elected in 2013, born in Buenos Aires, Argentina.

Countries

Inclusion of other regions

Brazil 
Brazil, being a country of continental dimensions, presents great internal regional differences.

While its 4 southernmost states (Paraná, Rio Grande do Sul, Santa Catarina and São Paulo) share characteristics with Argentina, Chile and Uruguay (high standard of living, subtropical and temperate climate, high levels of industrialization and strong European ethnic component due to immigration), the other states are more similar to the other South American countries in these issues.

For this reason, Brazil is included in some meanings when speaking in Southern Cone, but excluded in others.

When the definition is not limited to entire countries, the states of the South Region and the state of São Paulo are generally included.

Paraguay 
Due to the geographical proximity, common history, geography and political cycles, Paraguay is usually included in what is meant by Southern Cone. However, it contrasts strongly with other countries given the strong influence of guarani culture and due to the fact that it has not received a comparable amount of European immigration and foreign investment, though in the last few years this seems to be changing partly due to the political and macro-economical stability the country has experienced since the early 2000s.

Demography

The population of Argentina, Chile and Uruguay is 40, 16.8 and 3.6 million respectively. Buenos Aires is the largest metropolitan area at 13.1 million and Santiago, Chile has 6.4 million.

By contrast, the Patagonia region of southern Chile and Argentina is very sparsely populated, with a population density of less than two people per square kilometer.

Ethnicity
The population of the Southern Cone has been strongly influenced by waves of immigration from Europe in the late nineteenth and early twentieth centuries. People of European descent, make up 85% of the total population of Argentina, 88% of total population of Uruguay and 60% of total population of Chile. In São Paulo, Paraná, Rio Grande do Sul, and Santa Catarina self-identified white people are 61.3%; 70.0%; 82.3%; and 86.8% of the population respectively, with people of Italian and German ancestry predominating.

Italians started to emigrate to the Southern Cone as early as the second half of the 17th century, and it became a mass phenomenon between 1880 and 1920 when Italy was facing social and economic disturbances. As a consequence of mass Italian immigration, the Southern Cone has the largest Italian diaspora in the world, with people of Italian descent being the majority in many places, with the highest percentage being in Argentina (62.5% Italian), and in the southern Brazilian state of Santa Catarina (60% Italian). Among all Italians who immigrated to Brazil, 70% went to the State of São Paulo. In consequence, the State of São Paulo has more people with Italian ancestry than any region of Italy itself, with São Paulo city being the most populous city with Italian ancestry in the world, of the 10 million inhabitants of São Paulo city, 60% (6 million people) have full or partial Italian ancestry (the largest city of Italy is Rome, with 2.5 million inhabitants). Small towns, such as Nova Veneza, have as much as 95% of their population of Italian descent.

The region also has a large German diaspora (second largest after the United States), with People of German descent being 25% of the population of Rio Grande do Sul and 35% of the population of Santa Catarina.

Mestizos make up 15.8% of the population and are a majority in Paraguay. Native Americans make up 3% of the population, most live in Chile. Mulattoes (people of European and African ancestry) mostly in Uruguay (0.2%), and Asians (1.0%), mostly in Argentina, the remaining 1.2%.

There is also a strong Arab presence in the Southern Cone, with people of full or at least partial Arab ancestry being 5% of the population of Uruguay and Chile, 9.8% of the population of Brazil, and 11% of the population of Argentina. Brazil has the largest number of Arabs outside the Middle East, with 20 million Brazilians being descendants of Arabs, while the Palestinian community in Chile is considered the largest outside the Arab world.

Genetic and historical roots
In Brazil, about 190 "racial" categories were detected by the Census of 1976.

Blacks made up 25% of the population of Buenos Aires in 1810, 1822 and 1838. In 1887, the government decided to cease asking Argentine citizens about their race. According to Laura López, it was a way to "hide" the Black population, not only from the Census, but also from the public opinion.  Chile does not ask its citizens about race, but a study from the University of Chile concluded that Whites make 60% of the Chilean population, while the CIA World Factbook described 88.4% of the population as white and mestizo.

A study conducted on 218 individuals in 2010 by the Argentine geneticist Daniel Corach, has established that the genetic map of Argentina is composed by 79% from different European ethnicities (mainly Spanish and Italian ethnicities), 18% of different indigenous ethnicities, and 4.3% of African ethnic groups, in which 63.6% of the tested group had at least one ancestor who was Indigenous.
An autosomal DNA study from 2009 found the composition of the Argentine population to be 78,50% European, 17,30% Mixed Race, and 4,20% Sub-Saharan African (SSA).

A DNA study from 2009, published in the American Journal of Human Biology, showed the genetical composition of Uruguay to be mainly European, but with Native American (which varies from 1% to 20% in different parts of the country) and also SSA (7% to 15% in different parts of the country).

An autosomal DNA study from 2014 found out Chile to be 44.34% (± 3.9%) Native American, 51.85% (± 5.44%) European and 3.81% (± 0.45%) African.

In the case of Chile,"The use of mitochondrial DNA and Y chromosome" test results show the following: The European component is predominant (91.0%, versus 9.0% of the aboriginal one) in the Chilean upper class, the middle classes, 66.8%-62.3% European component and 37.7%-33.2 of mixed aboriginal and lower classes at 55%-52.9% European component and 47.1%-45% mix of Aboriginal.

Similar to the rest of Latin America, the genetic ancestry of the population of the Southern Cone reflects the history of the continent: the Iberian colonizers were mostly men who arrived without women. In consequence, they had children with the local Indigenous or enslaved African women. A European immigration to this part of the World in the late 19th and early 20th centuries (massive in Argentina, Uruguay, and south and southeastern Brazil, modest in elsewhere in Brazil, Chile and Paraguay)
 brought more European and northern Middle Eastern components to the local population – mainly Spaniards in Chile, Italians and Spaniards in Argentina and Uruguay, Italians in São Paulo, Italians, Germans and Poles in southern Brazil.

Education and standards of living
The other conspicuous characteristic of the Southern Cone is its relatively high standard of living and quality of life. Argentina's, Chile's, and Uruguay's HDIs — (0.827), (0.847) and (0.804) — are the highest in Latin America, similar to countries in Eastern Europe, such as Croatia, Hungary or Romania. Uruguay, where illiteracy technically does not exist, reaches the same level in this area, even considering that it faces restrictions to its industrial and economic growth. The Southern Cone is the most prosperous macro-region in Latin America. It has high life expectancy, access to health care and education. From an economic and liberal point of view the region has been praised for its significant participation in the global markets, and its "emerging economy" profile. More troubling are high levels of income inequality.

 
 Central America
 
 
 
 
 
 
 
 South America
 
 
 
 
 
 
 Southern Cone

Politics

During the second half of 20th century, these countries were in some periods ruled by right-wing juntas, military nationalistic dictatorships.
Around the 1970s, these regimes collaborated in Plan Cóndor against leftist opposition, including urban guerrillas.
However, by the early 1980s Argentina and Uruguay restored their democracies; Chile followed suit in 1990.

Governments
Timeline of presidents

See also
 Andean states
 Caribbean South America
 Northern Mexico
 Northern Triangle of Central America
 The Guianas

Notes

References

External links